The Burcina Park “Felice Piacenza” Nature Reserve is a protected, wooded, about 57 hectares wide area. It was established in 1980 with a law of the Piedmont Region Government. It is located within the municipalities of Pollone and Biella. The Municipality of Biella owns almost three quarters of the whole surface.

The difference in altitude varies from 570 to 829 meters above sea level.

The reserve is situated on the Burcina hill, or bric (as locally called). It protects the natural, environmental and landscape characteristics of the area. More specifically, it supports and promotes scientific, cultural and educational activities, also involving schools.

Geography
The Burcina is a woody hill crossed by the border between the Municipality of Pollone and the Municipality of Biella. Its north-eastern slopes belong to the basin of the stream Oropa, while the south-western ones, where the park is situated, are in the area of the stream Oremo. A pass at 730 m a.s.l. connects the Bric with the rest of the Biellese Alps.

Considering its quite isolated position, the Burcina is well recognizable within the area.

Archaeology
Some findings in the area of the park attest the presence of Homo sapiens about 35.000 years ago. On the Burcina hill there is also evidence of a protohistoric establishment dating back to the Bronze Age and the Iron Age.

Historic notes

Built in imitation of nature, the park can be reached through the main roads leading to Biella.

It is dedicated to Felice Piacenza, main creator of the green area and son of Giovanni Piacenza, who bought it. Giovanni Piacenza was an industrialist in the wool sector, born in Pollone. In the first half of the 19th century, he decided to transform the Burcina hill into a park drawing inspiration from the style of the English landscape garden, that had been in fashion in England since the 18th century, with woodland garden sections.

The first exotic plants (mainly giant sequoias) were planted in the lower part of the hill where, together with the first paths, a small, still existing, lake with fountains was created in 1848.

The park was then extended by Felice Piacenza, who dedicated more than fifty years of his life to this work. He realized a spectacular valley of rhododendrons, several paths and walkways and he planted several exotic species of plants.

The park was acquired by the Municipality of Biella in 1934. In the second postwar period it was modified with the opening of a new entry with o bridge over the brook Vandorba, designed by architect Pietro Porcinai. A bronze bust portraying Felice Piacenza, made by sculptor Leonardo Bistolfi, was placed in the park. In 1959 some archaeological evidence was found in the park, such as some adzes and a bronze jug.

Valley of rhododendrons, imitation of nature

The park has three foot entrances situated in the lower, middle and higher parts. It is known worldwide for its extraordinary valley of rhododendrons, covering two of the fifty-seven hectares of the park, that in the middle of May offers a unique floral display.

The garden park
The wood is the natural background of the park, whose top can be reached by means of a road leading to the Martini Tower.
The garden was designed as informal in order to enhance its spectacular, natural features. The plants are only apparently organized in a random order, with the aim of imitating what happens in nature. The internal woods are combined with meadows and clearings, while huge trees raise isolated and majestic.

The exotic species have been integrated into the local flora, that includes the typical broadleaved plants of the Mediterranean area:
Beech
Chestnut
Maple
Fraxinus
Oak
Prunus avium
Birch

Fauna
The Burcina Park is also interesting for its fauna, especially for birdwatchers.

Mammals living in the park are:
Tree squirrel
Hazel dormouse
Common vole
European hedgehog
Red fox
European badger
Hare

Birds migratory or nonmigratory:
House sparrow
European robin
Eurasian blackcap
Tit
Common chaffinch
Common blackbird
Emberizidae
Eurasian sparrowhawk
Hawfinch
European pied flycatcher
Eurasian magpie
Eurasian jay
Carrion crow
Rook

Gallery

See also 
 CoEur - In the heart of European paths
 Path of Saint Charles

References

External links
Official website
News about the park

Parks in Piedmont
Tourist attractions in Piedmont